The Evangelical Lutheran Church (ELC) was a Lutheran denomination that existed from 1917, when it was founded as the Norwegian Lutheran Church of America (NLCA), until 1960, when it joined two other church bodies to form the second American Lutheran Church.

In 1959, just before its merger into the ALC, the ELC had 2,242 pastors, 2,482 congregations, and 1,125,867 members.

Background
The Norwegian Lutheran Church of America was formed by the merger of the Hauge Synod (est. 1876), the Norwegian Synod (est. 1853), and the United Norwegian Lutheran Church of America (est. 1890). The NLCA changed its name to the Evangelical Lutheran Church (ELC) in 1946 as part of its Americanization process. In 1960, the ELC joined with Lutheran churches of German and Danish backgrounds to form  The American Lutheran Church, the first Lutheran body in North America to have multiple ethnic backgrounds. This coalescence of Lutheran churches continued into recent times, with the ALC later joining others 28 years later to form the Evangelical Lutheran Church in America in 1988.

Colleges associated with the ELC
Augustana College (South Dakota)
Concordia College, Moorhead
Luther College
Pacific Lutheran University
St. Olaf College
Waldorf College (junior college at that time)

ELC seminary
Luther Theological Seminary Saint Paul, Minnesota

Presidents of the ELC
Hans Gerhard Stub, 1917–1925
Johan Arnd Aasgaard, 1925–1954
Fredrik A. Schiotz, 1954–1960

Conventions of the ELC
From 1917 to 1926 a general convention was held triennially. There was need of holding several extraordinary conventions, so beginning in 1928 (called the 8th) it was held biennially with the general convention always falling on the even numbered years.  Voting members of the conventions were pastors who were currently serving congregations of the Church, and one lay representative from each parish consisting of one congregation and two representatives from each parish consisting of two or more congregations.

Organizing convention, 1917, Saint Paul, Minnesota
1st extraordinary, 1918, Fargo, North Dakota
1st general convention, 1920, Minneapolis, Minnesota
2nd extraordinary convention, 1922, Minneapolis, Minnesota
2nd general convention, 1923, Saint Paul, Minnesota
3rd extraordinary convention, 1925, Saint Paul, Minnesota
3rd  general convention, 1926, Minneapolis, Minnesota
8th  general convention, 1928, Minneapolis, Minnesota
9th  general convention, 1930, Minneapolis, Minnesota
10th general convention, 1932, Minneapolis, Minnesota
11th general convention, 1934, Minneapolis, Minnesota
12th general convention, 1936, Minneapolis, Minnesota
13th general convention, 1938, Minneapolis, Minnesota
14th general convention, 1940, Minneapolis, Minnesota
15th general convention, 1942, Minneapolis, Minnesota
16th general convention, 1944, Minneapolis, Minnesota
17th general convention, 1946, Minneapolis, Minnesota
18th general convention, 1948, Minneapolis, Minnesota
19th general convention, 1950, Minneapolis, Minnesota
20th general convention, 1952, Minneapolis, Minnesota
21st general convention, 1954, Minneapolis, Minnesota
22nd general convention, 1956, Minneapolis, Minnesota
23rd general convention, 1958, Minneapolis, Minnesota
24th general convention, 1960, Minneapolis, Minnesota

See also

 The Norwegian Lutheran Church in the United States
 Evangelical Lutheran Synod

References

Nelson, E. Clifford,  Norsemen on the  Prairies. America's Lutherans (ed. Omar Bonderud and  Charles Lutz. Columbus, OH: Wartburg Press. 1958. page 20-23)
Nelson, E. Clifford, and Fevold, Eugene L., The Lutheran Church among Norwegian-Americans: a History of the Evangelical Lutheran Church (Minneapolis. MN: Augsburg Publishing House, 1960)

External links
ELCA predecessor church bodies
Evangelical Lutheran Church from LCMS Christian Cyclopedia

Evangelical Lutheran Church in America predecessor churches
Christian organizations established in 1917